The 2000 Vuelta a España was the 55th edition of the Vuelta a España, one of cycling's Grand Tours. The Vuelta began in Málaga, with an individual time trial on 26 August, and Stage 12 occurred on 7 September with a stage from Zaragoza. The race finished in Madrid on 17 September.

Stage 12
7 September 2000 — Zaragoza to Zaragoza,

Stage 13
9 September 2000 — Santander to Santander,

Stage 14
10 September 2000 — Santander to Lakes of Covadonga,

Stage 15
11 September 2000 — Cangas de Onís to Gijón,

Stage 16
12 September 2000 — Oviedo to Alto de l'Angliru,

Stage 17
13 September 2000 — Benavente to Salamanca,

Stage 18
14 September 2000 — Béjar to Ciudad Rodrigo,

Stage 19
15 September 2000 — Salamanca to Ávila,

Stage 20

Stage 21
17 September 2000 — Madrid to Madrid,  (ITT)

References

2000 Vuelta a España
Vuelta a España stages